Mahara Prison is a maximum security prison, and is one of the largest prisons in Sri Lanka. Situated in the old city of Mahara in the Western Province, it was built in 1875 by the British colonial government to ease the congestion at the Slave Island prison. It was used to house the prisoners employed in crushing stones at the Mahara quarry. Since its establishment, it has had a police post attached to it. The prison is administrated by the Department of Prisons.

History

1902 prison break 
There was a revolt at the quarry and an escape by 79 inmates around 2:00 pm on 28 June 1902. Prison officers on guard were assaulted and the revolver of the Deputy Jailor was seized by the riot leader. An army team, headed by Major Bishop and assisted by the Jailor, were able to take into custody 40 escapees from the neighborhood. This was the first and the biggest ever escape in the history of the Sri Lanka Prisons.

2020 prison riot 

A riot broke out in the facility on 30 November 2020, resulting in the deaths of 8 prisoners. The riot occurred after rumors spread that other Sri Lankan prisons were transferring their prisoners infected with COVID-19 to Mahara.

Famous inmates
 Utuwankande Sura Saradiel - bandit turned Freedom fighter, the Robin Hood of Sri Lanka 
 Maradankadawala Yakadaya
 Navarian alias Fancis Fernando 
 Cutex Piyadasa 
 Keragala Siresana alias cheena
 Watareka Jayasundara
 Gampaha Munidasa

External links
Mahara Prison, Department of Prisons

References 

1876 establishments in Ceylon
British colonial prisons in Sri Lanka
Prisons in Sri Lanka
Residential buildings in Gampaha District